The Calling is an album by Méav Ní Mhaolchatha. It was released in 2013 under the label Warner Classics, and was produced by Craig Leon.

Track listing

Personnel
Musicians
Nicky Bailey - Percussion
Paul Clarvis - Percussion
Simon Edwards - Bass
Paula Hughes - Violin
Craig Leon - Guitar, keyboards
Eunan McDonald - Backing vocals
Méav - Arrangement, vocals
Simon Morgan - Backing vocals
John O'Brien - Flute, Uillean pipes, whistle
Katie O'Connor - Violin
Anne Marie O'Farrell - Harp
John Parricelli	 - Guitar, mandolin
Gerald Peregrine - Cello, violin
Kenneth Rice - Violin
Cliodhna Ryan - Violin
Una O'Kane - Violin

Technical
Simon Gibson - Mastering
Craig Leon - Mixing, producer
Brian Masterson - Engineer
Richard Woodcroft - Engineer

References

2013 albums
Warner Music Group albums
Méav Ní Mhaolchatha albums